A suicide mini-bus bomber detonated his bus filled with explosives at a northern checkpoint in the Shi'ite town of Hilla in southern Iraq, trapping civilians in their vehicles, where they were killed or seriously injured as the explosion destroyed over 50 vehicles near the mini-bus. Although no one claimed responsibility for the attack, a provincial official claimed that the attack was the work of Al Qaeda. 45 people were killed and at least 157 others were wounded.

References

2014 murders in Iraq
21st-century mass murder in Iraq
Mass murder in 2014
Terrorist incidents in Iraq in 2014
Hillah
March 2014 events in Iraq